KPUP-LP (100.5 FM) is a radio station licensed to serve Patagonia, Arizona.  The station is owned by Patagonia Community Radio, Inc.. It airs a Variety format.

The station was assigned the KPUP-LP call letters by the Federal Communications Commission on May 4, 2004.

See also
 List of community radio stations in the United States

References

External links
 
 KPUP-LP service area per the FCC database

PUP-LP
PUP-LP
Santa Cruz County, Arizona
Radio stations established in 2005
2005 establishments in Arizona
Variety radio stations in the United States
Community radio stations in the United States